Ruggero Rossato (born 27 June 1968) is an Italian gymnast. He competed at the 1992 Summer Olympics where he placed 22nd in the individual all around and 5th with the Italian team in the team final.

References

1968 births
Living people
Italian male artistic gymnasts
Olympic gymnasts of Italy
Gymnasts at the 1992 Summer Olympics
Sportspeople from Padua